Salvador Q. Quizon (December 6, 1924 – August 5, 2016) was a Filipino prelate of the Catholic Church.

Quizon was born in Manila, Philippines, was ordained a priest on March 12, 1949, and consecrated bishop on August 22, 1979. Quizon was appointed auxiliary bishop of the Archdiocese of Lipa on 1979. Quizon retired as Auxiliary Bishop of the Archdiocese of Lipa on April 6, 2002. He was the Titular Bishop of Feradi Minus

References

1924 births
2016 deaths
20th-century Filipino Roman Catholic priests
21st-century Filipino Roman Catholic priests